Emma Bale (born Emma Balemans, 2 August 1999) is a Belgian singer, who is most notable for her cover of "All I Want" by Kodaline and her number-one song in Flanders, "Fortune Cookie".

In September 2015, Bale, alongside producer Hans Francken released an EP titled, My Untouched World, with six songs, including Bale's charted songs. "Run" was also remixed by Lost Frequencies.

Bale competed in Flanders' version of The Voice Kids, failing to advance to the finals after losing out in the sing-off.

Discography

Studio albums

Singles

References

1999 births
Belgian women pop singers
Belgian child singers
Living people
21st-century Belgian women singers
21st-century Belgian singers